Hidayat Ullah Khan (born 1 January 1956) is a Pakistani politician who is currently serving as a member of the Senate of Pakistan from the Khyber Pakhtunkhwa since March 2021. He belongs to Awami National Party. He also served as a member of the Khyber Pakhtunkhwa Assembly and Provincial Minister for Livestock and Dairy Development from 2008 to 2013.

References

Living people
1956 births
Pakistani Senators 2021–2027
Awami National Party politicians
Khyber Pakhtunkhwa MPAs 2008–2013